Calacalí is a rural parish of Quito Canton, Pichincha Province, Ecuador. It is northwest of Casitagua Volcano and southwest of Pululagua Volcano.

In the central square of Calacalí there is an equator monument. A similar, larger equator monument is in Ciudad Mitad del Mundo.

Calacalí is the first village of the eastern end of a road known as Carretera Calacalí-La Independencia.

Parishes of Quito Canton